Buchanan Valley may refer to:

 Buchanan Valley in Adams County, Pennsylvania, USA
 Buchanan Valley Township, Emmons County, North Dakota, in the USA.
 Buchanan Valley, between Gettysburg, Pennsylvania and Chambersburg, in the state of Pennsylvania, USA. It was the site of the kidnap of Mary Jemison in the 18th century.
 Buchanan Valley, an area of Pine Valley in Halfway, Baker City, Idaho, in the USA.